Hayley Bateup (born 9 January 1980 in Gold Coast, Queensland, Australia) is an Australian professional ironwoman, surf life saver and model. She has won The Coolangatta Gold three times.

Bateup appeared on the 2008 series of Australian Gladiators as ‘Nitro’.

Her long-time partner is April Zekulich.

References

External links
 

Living people
1980 births
Sportspeople from the Gold Coast, Queensland
Australian LGBT sportspeople
Australian female models
Australian surf lifesavers
Australian female swimmers
Sportswomen from Queensland
LGBT swimmers
21st-century Australian women